3rd Marine Hamza Sayyid-ush-Shuhda Brigade is a marines brigade of Islamic Republic of Iran Navy based in Konarak, Sistan and Baluchestan Province. The unit operates in Gulf of Oman.

Establishment
3rd Marine brigade of Iranian Navy was established by Commander Seyyed Hossein Molayi. Commander Molayi was killed in action when he was locating practice field for the newly established Brigade in South East of Iran on September 12, 2011. He was trapped within an ambush and killed by the mobs.

References 

Special forces of Iran
Iranian marine brigades
Sistan and Baluchestan Province